Richard Mannello is an American football coach. He served as the head football coach at King's College in Wilkes-Barre, Pennsylvania from 1991 to 2009, compiling a record of 70–104–1. He built the program from the ground up after the school had ended varsity football in the early 1960s.

After several years away from college coaching, Mannello returned to the sidelines in 2015 as the head coach at Dallas High School in Dallas, Pennsylvania.

Head coaching record

College

References

Year of birth missing (living people)
Living people
Northeastern Huskies football coaches
King's College Monarchs football coaches
Springfield Pride football coaches
Springfield Pride football players
High school football coaches in Pennsylvania